The 2022 Saint Francis Red Flash football team represented Saint Francis University as a member of the Northeast Conference (NEC) during the 2022 NCAA Division I FCS football season. The Red Flash, led by 12th-year head coach Chris Villarrial, played their home games at DeGol Field.

Previous season

The Red Flash finished the 2021 season with a record of 5–6, 4–3 NEC play to finish in a tie for fourth place.

Schedule

Game summaries

at Akron

at Richmond

at Wagner

at Norfolk State

Central Connecticut

at LIU

Stonehill

at Sacred Heart

at Georgetown

Duquesne

at Merrimack

FCS Playoffs

at No. 23 Delaware – First Round

References

Saint Francis
Saint Francis Red Flash football seasons
Northeast Conference football champion seasons
Saint Francis
Saint Francis Red Flash football